William E. Johnston was an American football player and coach of football, basketball and baseball. He served as the head football coach at Central University of Kentucky—now known as Centre College—in Danville, Kentucky from 1905 to 1908, the College of Wooster in Wooster, Ohio from 1909 to 1910, and the Colorado School of Mines in Golden, Colorado in 1912. During his time at Wooster, Johnston also served as the school's head basketball coach (1909–1911) and head baseball coach (1910–1911). Johnston served as the head basketball coach during his time Colorado Mines, from 1911 to 1913.

References

Year of birth missing
Year of death missing
American football halfbacks
Centre Colonels football coaches
Colorado Buffaloes football players
Colorado Mines Orediggers football coaches
Colorado Mines Orediggers men's basketball coaches
Wooster Fighting Scots baseball coaches
Wooster Fighting Scots football coaches
Wooster Fighting Scots men's basketball coaches